The Pan American Para-Badminton Championships is a tournament organized by the Para Badminton World Federation (PBWF) which has now merged with the BWF. This tournament is hosted to crown the best para-badminton players in the Americas.

The inaugural edition of the tournament was hosted in Curitiba, Brazil in 2010.

Championships

Individual championships 
The table below states all the host cities (and their countries) of the Pan American Championships.

Past winners

2010 Curitiba

2013 Guatemala City

2014 Havana

2016 Medellín

2018 Lima

2022 Cali

See also 

 Pan American Badminton Championships
 Pan Am Junior Badminton Championships

Note

References 

 
Para-badminton
Americas
b